Bamfurlong railway station served the village of Bamfurlong part of Abram, to the south of Wigan.

The line before the station

From 1 January 1846 the NUR was leased jointly by the Grand Junction Railway (GJR) and the Manchester and Leeds Railway (M&LR). Later in 1846 the leases passed, by amalgamation from the GJR to the London and North Western Railway (L&NWR) and from the M&LR to the Lancashire and Yorkshire Railway.

The station
The station opened on 1 April 1878. It was located in a cutting to the west of Bamfurlong Hall. There were no facilities for goods traffic, the station was only provided for passenger and parcel traffic.

The station building was on the east platform, to the south of the road overbridge which crossed the platforms, which extended under the bridge at the north. The building was a two-storey brick-built building accessed from Lily Lane with the booking hall at road level, steps went down to each platform, the west-side platform steps descending from a pedestrian bridge crossing the lines. There was a wooden shelter on each platform. The maps and photographs show a line to the west of the station, this was a mineral line connecting Cross Tetly's Bamfurlong and Mains Collieries. At the time of opening the station hosted four trains to and five from Wigan.

The running lines through the station site were quadrupled in 1892 with "fast" lines being provided to the east of the station, these lines effectively by-passed the station.

In 1922 thirteen northbound and twelve southbound services called at Bamfurlong on Mondays to Saturdays, most were local services. Southbound they mostly started from Wigan, the first train, the 0623, began at Preston. There were no Sunday services.

The station closed on 27 November 1950.

After closure
Following the dismantling of Bamfurlong railway station, a platform remained for many years, increasingly overgrown. By 2015 the only remaining evidence was the track alignment.

Local passenger traffic ceased between Crewe and Preston via Earlestown on 6 October 1969.

The lines through the station site were electrified as part of the West Coast Main Line (WCML) modernisation in 1974, this involved the bridge carrying Lily Lane to be rebuilt during the period 1970–1 to provide additional clearance.

The lines through the station site are still open in 2020.

References

Notes

Citations

Sources

Further reading

External links

 Bamfurlong station via Wigan World
 Bamfurlong station via Disused Stations UK
 Bamfurlong station on a 1948 OS Map via npe Maps

Disused railway stations in the Metropolitan Borough of Wigan
Former North Union Railway stations
Railway stations in Great Britain opened in 1878
History of Wigan
Railway stations in Great Britain closed in 1950